Herman Vanderpoortenstadion (also called Het Lisp []) is a multi-use stadium in Lier, Belgium.  It is currently used mostly for football matches and was the home ground of Lierse between 1925 and 2018.  The stadium holds 14,538, including 4,311 standing places, 522 business seats, 102 VIP seats and 3 loges. Following the bankruptcy of Lierse in 2018, it is unclear who will be the new tenants.

It is located along the Lispersesteenweg, the road leading to Lisp, the neighbourhood of Lier where the club is located. The stadium is named after Herman Vanderpoorten, a Belgian politician, former mayor of Lier between 1982 and 1984.

References

External links
Lierse SK official website
Herman Vanderpoortenstadion

Football venues in Flanders
Sports venues in Antwerp Province
Lier, Belgium